FAT Taiwan Inc., doing business as Far Eastern Air Transport (FAT), was an airline with its head office in Songshan District, Taipei, Taiwan (Republic of China).

Established in 1957, it operated domestic services from Taipei and Kaohsiung to five regional cities and international services to Southeast Asia, South Korea and Palau. Its main base was Taipei Songshan Airport. After a succession of financial crises in early 2008, the airline publicly announced its bankruptcy and stopped all flights with effect from 13 May 2008. The airline recommenced operations on 18 April 2011. The airline emerged from bankruptcy restructuring on 16 October 2015. The airline continued to face financial problems, and operations were halted from 13 December 2019.

History 

The airline was established in 1957 and started operations in November the same year. It originally focused on charter flights until the introduction of scheduled services in January 1965. For the next 30 years the airline was the No. 1 carrier on Taiwanese domestic routes and was granted the right to fly regular international flights in 1996, from Kaohsiung International Airport to Palau and Subic Bay. It started cargo operations in the Asian region in 2004.  Beginning in 2004, FAT invested in the Cambodian airline, Angkor Airways. Angkor Airways subsequently shut down flight operations on 9 May 2009.

Due to ever-rising fuel prices and Taiwan High Speed Rail's inauguration, the airline suffered financial losses from early 2007 and the situation was seriously worsened by poor financial management and risky investments. On 13 February 2008 FAT failed to pay USD 848,000 it owed to the International Clearing House, a financial subsidiary of the International Air Transport Association (IATA); and IATA cancelled the airline's membership as a result. Although a local court granted FAT's restructuring application on 23 February 2008, in the next three months it still failed to obtain the necessary funds and the company's bankruptcy protection expired on 22 May. FAT had stopped paying employee salaries but the staff were still on duty as of May 2008 because they wanted to try to save the company but some were saying they could not hold on much longer.

On 27 November 2010, a McDonnell Douglas MD-83 of FAT began flight test at Taipei Songshan Airport at 10am, marking the airline's return to the skies. The aviation authority in Taiwan granted a test flight license to FAT but required an additional test flight and NT$ 50 million as deposit before re-granting an airline operating license. The airline restarted its services on 18 April 2011. Far Eastern Air Transport announced a stoppage affecting all operations on 13 December 2019. However, the next day, the company chairman rescinded the statement. Transportation minister Lin Chia-lung confirmed on 16 December 2019 that Far Eastern Air Transport had in fact ceased operations, and had to discuss resuming services with the Civil Aeronautics Administration. In January 2020, the Civil Aeronautics Administration recommended to the Ministry of Transportation and Communications that Far Easter Air Transport's air operator certificate be revoked. Later that month, company chairman Chang Kang-wei stated that a group of people led by Tsai Meng-che offered to invest in Far Eastern Air Transport if the government lifted flight restrictions. Following the announcement, a number of FAT employees petitioned the government, asking relevant authorities to lift restrictions on the airline. The Ministry of Transportation and Communications formally revoked Far Eastern Air Transport's air operator certificate on 31 January 2020.

Destinations
Far Eastern Air Transport operated the following services when it ceased operations in December 2019:

Fleet 

As of December 2019, Far Eastern Air Transport operated the following aircraft:

Far Eastern Air Transport reached a deal to lease two Boeing 737-800s, one new and one used, from Air Lease Corporation in 2015, but a contract dispute over the condition of the used aircraft prevented both from entering service.

Previously operated
 Beechcraft C-45 Expeditor
 Boeing 737-100
 Boeing 737-200
 Boeing 757-200
 Douglas DC-3
 Douglas DC-6
 Handley Page Herald
 Sud Aviation Caravelle
 Vickers Viscount

Incidents and accidents
On 15 February 1969, Douglas DC-3 B-241 was damaged beyond economic repair in an accident at Kaohsiung International Airport, Taiwan.
On 24 February 1969, Far Eastern Air Transport Flight 104, a Handley Page Dart Herald, crashed near Tainan City. All 36 passengers and crew on board were killed.
On 24 April 1969, Douglas DC-3 B-251 was damaged beyond economic repair in a landing accident at Phan Thiết Airport, Vietnam. All 31 passengers and crew survived.
On 20 February 1970, Douglas DC-3 B-243 crashed into a mountain shortly after take-off from Taipei Songshan Airport. The aircraft was operating a cargo flight, both crew were killed.
On 7 October 1974, a Vickers Viscount was the subject of an attempted hijacking. The hijacker was overpowered and the aircraft landed at its intended destination of Taipei Songshan Airport.
On 31 July 1975, Vickers Viscount B-2029 of Far Eastern Air Transport crashed at Taipei Songshan Airport, killing 27 of the 75 people on board.
On 16 April 1977, Douglas DC-3 B-247 was damaged beyond economic repair in a landing accident at Tainan Airport.
On 22 August 1981, Far Eastern Air Transport Flight 103, a Boeing 737, broke up in flight. Severe corrosion in the fuselage structure led to an explosive decompression and breakup at high altitude. All 110 on board were killed.
On March 13, 2019, flight FE321 from Taipei to Kalibo, Aklan veered from the runway into muddy fields upon landing at Kalibo International Airport at 6:05 in the evening local Philippine time.

See also

 List of airlines of Taiwan

References

External links 

Far Eastern Air Transport 
Far Eastern Air Transport Fleet
 

 
Defunct airlines of Taiwan
Airlines established in 1957
Airlines disestablished in 2019
1957 establishments in Taiwan
2019 disestablishments in Taiwan
Companies based in Taipei